Lois Tobío Fernández (Viveiro, 13 June 1906 – Madrid, 13 March 2003) was a Galician diplomat, writer, translator and philologist.

He was one of the founders of the Seminario de Estudos Galegos in 1923.

Works
 As décadas de T.L., Ediciós do Castro, 1994. Autobiography
 A nova vida, Ediciós do Castro, 2006 (posthumous). Narrative
 Catro ensaios sobre o Conde de Gondomar, Patronato Ramón Otero Pedrayo, 1991
 Gondomar y los católicos ingleses, Ediciós do Castro, 1987
 Gondomar y su triunfo sobre Raleigh, Editorial Bibliófilos Gallegos, 1974
 A intervención de Gondomar nos problemas internacionais da pesca, Ediciós do Castro, 1984

References

1906 births
2003 deaths
People from A Mariña Occidental
Spanish emigrants to Cuba
Spanish emigrants to Uruguay
Spanish diplomats
Writers from Galicia (Spain)
Galician translators
English–Spanish translators
Translators from English
Translators from German
Translators to Spanish
Translators to Galician
20th-century translators
Exiles of the Spanish Civil War in Argentina
Exiles of the Spanish Civil War in Cuba
Exiles of the Spanish Civil War in the United States
Exiles of the Spanish Civil War in France
Exiles of the Spanish Civil War in Uruguay